Yo-u-hoe (Association of Women Friends) was a Korean women's organization, founded in 1899.

The purpose was to fight discriminating Confucian practices such as gender segregation and concubines. It hosted a famous sit-in demonstration at the Toksu Palace in protest against the traditional male privilige custom of concubinage.

See also
 Sunseong-hoe
 Chanyang-hoe

References

 

Organizations established in 1899
1899 establishments
Women's rights organizations
Women's organizations based in Korea
1899 in Korea
Feminism in Korea
History of women in Korea